The Sechín River is a seasonal river about  long in the Ancash department of Peru that remains dry for long seasons, increasing its volume at times of rain in the mountains at its source. It is of irregular regime, due to this is known as Loco River. The Casma-Sechin basin runs down the western slopes of the Andes mountain range - one of the world’s driest deserts. The city of Casma, population 30,000, is located near the junction of the two rivers. The Pan-American Highway crosses the Sechin River at Casma.  

Historical records showed that the Sechín was severely affected by flooding in 1925 from an extremely strong El Niño cycle. Elders alive at the time recounted that the rains of 1925 were significantly stronger than those in 1871 and 1891, although the rains from 1891 were considered "calamatious." 

The archeological site of Cerro Sechín was discovered near the Sechín River by Peruvian archeologist Julio C. Tello in 1937. Cerro Sechin is one of the archaeological sites of the Casma–Sechin culture along the two rivers. The Casma-Sechin culture is one of the oldest civilizations in the Americas with monumental architecture dating back to 3600 BCE.

See also
Cerro Sechín
Mojeque

References 

Rivers of Peru
Rivers of Ancash Region